The following roads are called the East-West Highway or a variant:
East–West Highway (Malaysia)
East-West Highway (Nepal)
East–West Motorway (Romania)
East–West Highway (Algeria)
United States:
East-West Expressway (Miami), Florida, now known as the Dolphin Expressway (SR 836)
East-West Expressway (Orlando), Florida (SR 408)
East-West Highway (Harford County, Maryland), northeast of Baltimore
East-West Highway (Maryland suburbs), near Washington, D.C.
East-West Highway (New England), a proposal across northern New England